Allianz Trade is an international insurance company that offers a range of services, including trade credit insurance, debt collection, surety bonds and guarantees, business fraud insurance and political risk protection.

A subsidiary of Allianz SE, Euler Hermes is rated AA by Standard & Poor's. It monitors the financial health of over 80 million companies.

Headquartered in Paris, the company is present in more than 50 countries with more than 5,500 employees, and has a global market share of 34%. They posted a consolidated turnover of €2.9billion in 2021, and insured global business transactions representing €931billion in exposure.

History

Creation of credit insurers around the world

 1883: ACI in the United States
 1917: Hermes Kreditversicherungsbank in Germany
 1918: Trade Indemnity in United Kingdom
 1927: SFAC in France and SIAC in Italy
 1929: COBAC in Belgium

Birth of Euler Hermes

In 1993, SFAC started to acquire the different local market leaders in trade credit insurance starting with COBAC. SFAC went onto acquire Trade Indemnity in 1996, followed by ACI and SIAC in 1998. The same year, Allianz acquired AGF, a shareholder of SFAC. THe holding "Compagnie Fincière SFAC" was renamed Euler.

From 2000, Euler got listed on the Paris Stock Exchange. Two years later in 2002, Euler acquired Hermes, the German market leader in trade credit insurance. Then in 2003, the Group and all its subsidiaries became Euler Hermes. 

Euler Hermes begins its international expansion in 2004, opening offices in Latin America, Asia Pacific, and the Middle East (UAE, Kuwait, Oman, and Qatar) between 2004 and 2009. In 2007, Euler Hermes increases its shareholding to 50% in COSEC, the market leader in Portugal. In 2013, Solunion, a joint venture between Euler Hermes & MAPFRE, was created covering Spain and Latin America. In the same year, Euler Hermes increased its shareholding in ICIC, a credit insurer in Israel, to 50%.

Joining the Allianz Group 
In 2018, Allianz completed the acquisition of Euler Hermes's outstanding shares and Euler Hermes Group became fully owned by the Allianz Group. In March 2022, Euler Hermes changed its brand name to Allianz Trade.

Activities

Trade credit insurance
This is an insurance policy and a risk management product offered to companies to protect their accounts receivables from loss due to credit risk. In the case their customers become insolvent or fall into protracted default, it includes indemnification for the values of goods or services delivered. The policy could include a component of political risk insurance, which insures the risk of non-payment by foreign clients due to issues such as currency problems, political unrest and expropriation. Some policies also include debt collection - the process of pursuing payment of debts owed by businesses.

Surety bonds and guarantees
A bond, or financial guarantee, protects the contractual obligations businesses have entered into with a customer, supplier or partner. It is a contractual triangle relationship between the business, the surety bond company or guarantor, and the third-party requiring the bond. The surety bond company or guarantor financially guarantees the third party that the business will abide by the terms established by the bond or guarantee. In the event of non-performance of the specified obligations, the surety bond company or guarantor is there to provide compensation for loss and damage.

Economic research 
Ludovic Subran is the Chief Economist of Allianz, and Ana Boata is Director of Economic Research of Allianz Trade. The department's economic research team analyzes and anticipates international economic trends and covers international commerce, macroeconomics, payment risks. Every quarter, the Economic Research Department updates its country risk and sector risk ratings.

Board of management 
 Aylin Somersan Coqui, CEO and Chairperson of the Board of Management
 Loeiz Limon-Duparcmeur, Group Chief Financial Officer - Group CFO - Member of Board of Management in charge of Finance and Tax.
 Anil Berry, Member of Board of Management in charge of Market Management, Commercial and Distribution
 Fabrice Desnos, Member of Board of Management in charge of Credit Intelligence, Reinsurance and Surety
 Michael Eitelwein, Group Chief Operating Officer - Member of Board of Management in charge of Operations and IT
 Florence Lecoutre, Member of Board of Management in charge of Transformation, Human Resources, Communication & ESG.

References

External links

 

Allianz
Financial services companies established in 2002
Banks established in 2002
Insurance companies of France
German brands
Reinsurance companies